John D. Freyer is an American artist who teaches at Virginia Commonwealth University.

Select projects
Audio
Audio Postcards, 2004–2005, produced for National Public Radio including such postcards as "On the Spin Cycle for Iowa's Ragbrai Race", "Iowa City Auction", and "Driven to Demolish".
Film and Video
Second Hand Stories, 2003, a travel collaboration with Christopher Wilcha of interviewing collectors, sellers, and bystanders of bought and sold objects.
Photography
Opening the Flatpack, co-organized by Freyer and anthropologist Johan Lindquist (Stockholm University) in collaboration with design and architecture firm Uglycute, investigated and developed methods for approaching IKEA's Billy bookcase as a site of conceptual concern.
Sculpture
Walm-Art, 2005, a fully functional “museum store” inside an art gallery that sold objects from a local Walmart.

External links
 Official website
 New York Times
 The Guardian

Living people
Virginia Commonwealth University faculty
American artists
Year of birth missing (living people)